Außervillgraten is a municipality in the district of Lienz in the Austrian state of Tyrol, Ski resort, hosted stages of the Alpine Skiing Europa Cup.

Population

References

Cities and towns in Lienz District